Five ships of the Royal Navy have borne the name Warwick, named after the English town of Warwick:

  was a 22-gun ship, formerly a privateer. She was captured in 1643, renamed HMS Old Warwick in 1650 and was broken up in 1660.
  was a 48-gun fourth rate launched in 1696.  She was rebuilt in 1710 and was broken up in 1726.
  was a 60-gun fourth rate launched in 1733.
  was a 50-gun fourth rate launched in 1767, converted to a receiving ship in 1783 and sold in 1802.
  was a W-class destroyer launched in 1917. She was converted into an escort destroyer in 1943 and was sunk in 1944.

See also
 

Royal Navy ship names